Dwain is a masculine given name. Notable people with the name include:

First names:
Dwain Anderson
Dwain Chambers
Dwain Esper
Dwain Lingenfelter
Dwain Sloat
Dwain Weston

Middle names:
Anthony Dwain Lee
Dan Dwain Schoonover
David Dwain Phelps
Demorrio Dwain Williams
Edward Dwain (Ike) Brookens
Michael Dwain Gallo

See also 
 Dewayne
 Duane (disambiguation)
 Dwaine
 Dwane
 Dwayne

Masculine given names